Calaveras Valley is a valley east of Milpitas, California in the San Francisco Bay Area. It has formed primarily as a result of the actions of the Calaveras Fault.  The southern end of the Calaveras Valley is a few miles south of Calaveras Reservoir, while the northern end is at Sunol.

See Calaveras Reservoir for more information.

References

Valleys of Santa Clara County, California
Landforms of the San Francisco Bay Area
Milpitas, California
Valleys of California